Northern Islands may refer to: 
Northern Islands Municipality, one of the four main political divisions of the Commonwealth of the Northern Mariana Islands
The Northern Isles, Shetland and Orkney
Northern Islands (GPU family), a series of ATI/AMD graphics processing units, superseding the Evergreen series